The 1913 Yale Bulldogs football team represented Yale University in the 1913 college football season. The Bulldogs finished with a 5–2–3 record. 

Howard Jones, who had previously coached Yale to a national championship in 1909, was hired in February 1913 to return as Yale's head coach.

Yale tackle Bud Talbott was a consensus pick for the 1913 College Football All-America Team, and four other Yale players (end Benjamin F. Avery and linemen Hank Ketcham, John S. Pendleton and William Marting) received first-team All-America honors from at least one selector.

Schedule

References

Yale
Yale Bulldogs football seasons
Yale Bulldogs football